Barkas is a neighborhood in Hyderabad, India, located in the old city area of Hyderabad. The name "Barkas" is believed to be derived from the English word "barracks". Before Indian independence, Barkas served as the military Barracks of the Nizam of Hyderabad.

The Chaush were brought from Yemen to work in the former Hyderabad State as military men for the Nizams. It is said that especially when it came to safeguarding Deccan, the 7th Nizam had absolute trust on these Arabs.
Another version states that "The name 'Barkas' is derived from 'Wadiya Barkas', which was a colony in Saudi Arabia. A regiment from Barkas in Arabia had been called to Hyderabad. Thus most of the residents of this colony were originally inhabitants of Yemen and Arabia."

History 
Before Indian independence, Barkas served as the military Barracks of the Nizam of Hyderabad. The Nizams were surrounded by hostile rulers in the Deccan and chose to employ Arabs instead of the local military for the safeguarding of his family. These Arabs formed the bulk of the Nizams' personal army and were more reliable as they could not defect to the rival states unlike locals and were trustworthy.

Many mentions state that the last Nizam loved their trait of Loyalty and trusted them more than anyone else. The Arab population increased during this period, settling in mainly in barracks on the outskirts of the walled, gated city.

Culture
The area is noted for culture with its Arab influences, which later became integral to the Culture of Hyderabad.

The local cuisine includes a sweet version of Harees (meat cooked with crushed wheat and spices) that is only available in Barkas. In the recent past Mandi, a Yemeni rice dish made with either chicken or mutton has grown into prominence which saw opening of multiple restaurants in Barkas and nearby areas.

Main attractions
Barkas houses a lot of mosques especially the 'Jama'a Masjid'.

'Barkas Maidan' a multi-use playground, which is helped the growth of great sportsmen especially in the field of football like Habeeb Khan, Salam Aidroosi, Majid Khan, etc. who have won laurels for Barkas at National and International level.

'Mandi Road' which is the main road of Barkas going to the Shamshabad Airport from Chandrayangutta crossroads. It is lined with many restaurants serving a variety of Arab cuisine. This road is named after the most popular Arab dish - the Mandi.

Cuisine
These restaurants also serve a variety of Arabic cuisine such as Kabsa, Majboos, Maqluba, Quzi, Saleeg and snacks such as Shawarma, Falafel and Mutabbaq.

Organisations

Barkas is home to "Jaundice Medicine Barkas", a non-profit organization providing free medication for Jaundice disease. The organisation is led by a team from Al Qureshi tribe.
 
Sabi Ul Khair is another non-profit organization established in Barkas catering to the social development of the area. And it offers various schemes for the social development of the locals, like providing funds for the marriage of girls belonging to poor households, funeral services etc.
 	
Barkas also has a non-profitable organization called "Bait-ul-Maal". The sole intent of this organization is to help needy people and looking for the betterment of communities.

External links
Video of Soldiers of NIZAMS of HYDERABAD
Barkas: A small Yemen in Hyderabad, Yemeni Lifestyle is following by barkas people
Barkas Street, A Mini Arabia In Hyderabad

Further reading
حيدرأباد والحضارمة والمحاولات العبثية لطمس هويتها الإسلامية, Al-Ayyam (Yemen), 14 May 2007
 Ababu Minda Yimene, An African Indian community in Hyderabad, Cuvillier Verlag, 2004, pg 201

References

Neighbourhoods in Hyderabad, India
Arab diaspora in India
Yemeni diaspora in Asia
People from Hyderabad State
Hyderabad State Forces